The J.C. Weinberger Winery, at 2849 St. Helena Hwy. in or near St. Helena, California, was listed on the National Register of Historic Places in 2015.

It is now the William Cole Vineyards.

A two-story addition,  in plan, was attached around 1878.

It was renovated in 1938 and in 2002.

References

National Register of Historic Places in Napa County, California
Buildings and structures completed in 1876